CW may stand for:

Science and technology
 centiwatt (cW), one hundredth of a watt
 Cω, a programming language
 CW complex, a type of topological space
 Carrier wave, in radio communications
 CodeWarrior, an integrated development environment by Metrowerks
 Constructed wetland, a man-made wetland to treat wastewater
 Continuous wave, a method of radio transmission (telegraphy) and a microwave theory
 ClarisWorks, an office suite now known as AppleWorks
 Drag coefficient, a measure of air resistance commonly denoted 
 Contention Window, a network traffic technique
 chemical formula of tungsten carbide

Arts and media

Gaming
 Castle Wolfenstein, a 1981 video game
 Cube World, a video game

Publications
 Computerworld, an information technology magazine
 The Crimson White, a student-run newspaper of the University of Alabama

Other media
 The CW, an American television network/programming service
The CW Plus, a national feed of the network
 Creative writing, any writing that goes outside the bounds of normal professional, journalistic, academic, or technical forms of literature
 CloverWorks, a Japanese animation studio

Companies
 Cable & Wireless plc, a British telecommunications company
 Colonial Williamsburg
 Curtiss-Wright, an engineering company (NYSE: CW)

Military
 Chemical warfare, using the toxic properties of chemical substances as weapons
 Chemical weapon, munition that uses chemicals formulated to inflict death or harm on humans
 Chief warrant officer (when followed by a numerical designation of rank), an officer in a military organisation who is designated an officer by a warrant
 Cold War, a state of geopolitical tension following World War II

Places
 CW postcode area around Crewe, England
 Canada West, an obsolete designation for the western part of Canada
 Canada's Wonderland, an amusement park in Vaughan, Ontario, Canada
 Cook Islands (FIPS Pub 10-4 and obsolete NATO designation), a self-governing island country in the South Pacific Ocean 
 County Carlow, in Ireland
 Curaçao (ISO 3166-1 alpha-2 country code CW), a Lesser Antilles island in the southern Caribbean Sea and the Dutch Caribbean region
 Calw, a city in southern Germany

Other uses
 Air Marshall Islands (IATA code CW), an airline based in Majuro, in the Marshall Islands
 Calendar week
 Christian Worship: A Lutheran Hymnal, a hymnal used by the WELS
 Clockwise, motion that proceeds in the same direction as a clock's hands
 Common Worship, a liturgy of the Church of England
 Conventional wisdom, a description of ideas that are generally accepted as true
 Cruiserweight (boxing), a weight class in professional boxing between light heavyweight and heavyweight
 Content warning
 Culture war
 C. W. Anderson (born 1970), professional wrestler
 A suffix for the cool-white halophoshate fluorescent lamp phosphor. See here: Fluorescent-Lamp Formats